Joakim "Jocke" Brodén (born 5 October 1980) is a Swedish-Czech musician who is the lead vocalist, keyboardist and occasional third guitarist of the Swedish heavy metal band Sabaton. He and bassist Pär Sundström formed the band in 1999.

Early life
Brodén's father, Ulf Olof Brodén, is from Sweden and his mother, Anna, is from former Czechoslovakia. He holds dual citizenship in Sweden and the Czech Republic. He has said that he became a metalhead when he was three or four years old because of the music video for Twisted Sister's "We're Not Gonna Take It". He was a competitive swimmer in his youth.

Musical career
Brodén once joined Stormwind for a tour as a keyboard player. Brodén founded Sabaton in 1999 with bassist Pär Sundström; he is the lead vocalist and keyboardist and an occasional third guitarist. He is also the one who came up with the name "Sabaton" for the band. And sabaton is a part of an armour placed on the foot.

Brodén is known for wearing an unusual vest with metal plates when performing with Sabaton; it has been described as resembling a bulletproof vest. He is also known for his distinctive mohawk hairstyle and "squared" facial hair. He is a baritone.

In 2015, Brodén lost a bet with his bandmates that committed him to travelling to Sabaton's next gig on foot; he had not realized their next engagement was in Trondheim, Norway, some 350 miles (560 km) away. Brodén stayed in the homes of several fans along the way.

On 26 November 2016, Brodén entered the Český slavík singing competition in the Czech Republic and was voted into fifth place with 9,286 points. The next year he entered again, but was removed from the competition due to a new rule that competitors had to primarily perform in the Czech Republic.

Pinball
In 2016 and 2017, Brodén took part in the Swedish national pinball championships, placing 167th the first time and 255th the second time.

Discography

Sabaton
Primo Victoria (2005)
Attero Dominatus (2006)
Metalizer (2007)
The Art of War (2008)
Coat of Arms (2010)
Carolus Rex (2012)
Heroes (2014)
 The Last Stand (2016)
 The Great War (2019)
 The War to End All Wars (2022)
 Weapons Of The Modern Age (2022)
 Heroes Of The Great War (2023)
Guest appearances

{|class="wikitable"
 
!Title
 
!Band
 
|-
 	
|"Lament for Soldier's Glory"
 
|Desert
 
|-
 	
|"Gates of Glory"
 	
|Twilight Force
 
|-
 
|"Rise of the Wise"
 	
|Wisdom
 
|-
 	
|"Primo Victoria" (Sabaton cover)
 
|Van Canto
 
|-
 
|"Call Me"
 
|Pain
 
|-
 	
|"Ibor & Aio"
 	
|Hulkoff
 	
|-
 
|"Pumping Iron Power"
 
|Grailknights
 	
|-
 
|"Heroes of Mighty Magic"
 	
|Twilight Force
 	
|-
 
|"Oh! Majinai"
 	
|Babymetal
 	
|-
 	
|"I Am a Viking"
|Thobbe Englund
|-
 	
|"The Tired Hero"
 	
|The Metal Alliance
|-
 	
|"Live or Die"
 	
|Apocalyptica
|-

|"Pasadena 1994"
 	
|Nanowar of Steel
|-
|}

References

Further reading

External links

 Joakim Broden at International Flipper Pinball Association

1980 births
English-language singers from Sweden
Living people
Swedish heavy metal guitarists
Swedish heavy metal keyboardists
Swedish heavy metal singers
Swedish male singer-songwriters
Swedish people of Czech descent
21st-century Swedish male singers
21st-century Swedish guitarists